The following is a list of municipal presidents of Aguascalientes Municipality, Mexico.

List of officials

 José López Nava, 1830  
 , 1835  
 , 1848-1849 
 Atanacio Rodríguez, 1842-1851, 1856 
 Luis Chávez, 1857 
 Antonio Rayón, 1845-1858, 1860-1861 
 Diego Pérez O., 1860,1866-1867 
 Francisco Hornedo, 1870 
 Librado Gallegos, 1870 
 Jacobo Jaime, 1870 
 Rodrigo Rincón, 1871-1874 
 Patricio de la Vega, 1875 
 Miguel Guinchard, 1878 
 Manuel Cardona, 1869-1870 
 Luis de la Rosa, 1875-1881 
 Alejandro Vázquez del Mercado, 1884-1886 
 Isaac de la Peña, 1884-1888 
 Ignacio Ortíz, 1895 
 Daniel Cervantes, 1897-1898 
 Felipe Ruiz, 1899-1900 
 Tomás Medina Ugarte, 1903 
 Zeferino Muñoz, 1903 
 Francisco Armengol, 1907-1908 
 José Cruz, 1911 
 Feliz Chavoyo, 1913 
 Jesús Martínez, 1913 
 Evaristo Femat, 1906, 1913 
 José A. Pinedo, 1914 
 Domingo Velasco, 1914 
 Alfredo Muñoz, 1914 
 Benito Díaz, 1915 
 Eugenio Ávila, 1915 
 Marcelino Macías, 1923 
 Samuel J. Guerra, 1923 
 Alfonso Rodríguez, 1923 
 Genaro Castillo, 1924 
 Juan Ibarra, 1923-1924 
 Manuel Chávez, 1924 
 José López, 1925 
 Gabriel Carmona, 1925 
 Pablo Ramírez, 1925-1926 
 Benjamín de la Mora, 1927 
 Rodolfo Rodarte, 1927 
 Ezequiel Viveros, 1915 
 Francisco Llamas, 1916 
 Vicente Magdaleno, 1916 
 Heladio Hernández, 1916 
 Ricardo Rodríguez, 1917 
 Rodrigo Palacios, 1918 
 José Díaz Morán, 1918 
 Vidal Roldán, 1920 
 Felipe Torres, 1921 
 J. Guadalupe Zamarripa, 1921 
 Victorino Médina, 1922 
 Aurelio Padilla, 1927 
 Enrique Montero, 1928 
 Alberto del Valle, 1928 
 Rafael Quevedo Morán, 1929 
 Gonzalo Ruvalcaba, 1930 
 Pedro Vital, 1932 
 Concepción Rodríguez, 1939-1940 
 Roberto Jefkins, 1940 
 Celestino López, 1941-1942 
 Francisco Revilla, 1942-1943 
 José Medina, 1944 
 Enrique Osornio, 1945-1947 
 Jaime Aizpuru, 1951-1953 
 Antonio Medina, 1954-1956 
 Carmelita Martín del Campo, 1957-1959 
 Gilberto Lòpez Velarde, 1960-1962 
 , 1963-1965 
 Juan Morales Morales, 1966-1968 
 Carlos Macias Arellano, 1969-1971 
 Ángel Talamantes Ponce, 1972-1974 
 Felipe Reynoso Jiménez, 1975-1977 
 Francisco Ramírez Martínez, 1978-1980 
 Pedro Rivas Cuéllar, 1981-1983 
 Miguel Romo Medina, 1984-1986 
 Héctor Manuel del Villar Martínez, 1987-1989 
 Armando Romero Rosales, 1990-1991 
 María Alicia de la Rosa López, 1991-1992 
 Fernando Gómez Esparza, 1993-1995 
 Alfredo Reyes Velázquez, 1996-1998 
 Luis Armando Reynoso, 1999-2001 
 Ricardo Magdaleno, 2002-2004 
 Martín Orozco Sandoval, 2005-2007 
 Gabriel Arellano Espinosa, 2008-2009 
 Adrián Ventura Dávila, 2010 
 Lorena Martínez Rodríguez, 2011-2013 
 Juan Antonio Martín del Campo Martín del Campo, 2014-2016 
 Juana Cecilia López Ortiz, 2021, interim
 María Teresa Jiménez Esquivel, 2017-2021
 Juana Cecilia López Ortiz, 2021, interim
 Leonardo Montañez Castro, 2022-present

See also
 
 
 Timeline of Aguascalientes City
 List of municipal presidents of Aguascalientes state, 2017-2019 (in Spanish)
 List of municipal presidents of Aguascalientes state, 2019-2021 (in Spanish)

References

Aguascalientes
 
People from Aguascalientes Municipality